Johann Baptist Hoffmann (9 July 18635 July 1937) was a German operatic baritone and voice teacher. A long-term member of the Berlin Court Opera, he performed leading roles in Europe, such as Verdi's Rigoletto and Wagner's Dutchman in Der fliegende Holländer. He took part in several world premieres in Berlin.

Life and career 
He was noticed as a boy soprano. He first worked as a salesman but decided for a singing career. August Kindermann in Munich and other singing teachers judged him unsuitable for opera singing, but he was accepted by Weinlich-Tipka in Munich. He made his operatic debut as a hunter in Kreutzer's Das Nachtlager in Granada.

He got an engagement at the Graz Opera, followed by a four-year engagement at the Cologne Stadttheater from 1888, where Valentin in Gounod's Faust and the title role in Wagner's Der fliegende Holländer (The Flying Dutchman) were among his successes. In 1890, the director of the then Deutsche Oper in New York wanted to engage Hoffmann but without success. In 1892 and 1893, Hoffmann refined his vocal skills with Julius Stockhausen in Frankfurt.

He was a member of the Hamburg Opera from 1894 to 1897. From 1895, he made guest performances in Germany, Austria, and the Netherlands, including as Hans Sachs in Wagner's Die Meistersinger von Nürnberg at the Berlin Court Opera and soon afterwards as Lysiart in Weber's Euryanthe. The audience regarded him as a successor of Franz Betz, the first Wotan at the Bayreuth Festival. In 1897, Hoffmann almost moved to the Vienna Court Opera with Gustav Mahler, Kapellmeister at the Hamburg Opera, but instead moved to the Berlin Court Opera as first baritone, and he remained there until 1919. He took part in several world premieres there, including Chabrier's Briséïs (in German) in 1899, Lortzing's Regina the same year, d'Albert's Kain in 1900, Leoncavallo's Der Roland von Berlin in 1904, and Humperdinck's  in 1905. In 1906, he appeared as Jochanaan in the house's first production of Salome by Richard Strauss.

His mother's death in 1908 plunged him into a deep life crisis. He wanted to give up singing after the end of his engagement in Berlin scheduled for 1910 but found new energy through an extended stay at Schloss Hornegg on Neckar. In November 1910, he appeared as the Minstrel in the German premiere of Humperdinck's opera Königskinder after Humperdinck had insisted on casting the role with Hoffmann. He extended his engagement to 1915 and again to 1919. He created roles in several world premieres in Berlin.

After the end of his stage career in 1919, Hoffmann began to train young singers. In 1928, he was appointed teacher at the Stern Conservatory.

Hoffmann's last public appearance was part of a charity event in Bad Kissingen. On 5 July 1937, Hoffmann died of a heart attack there.

The archive of the Berlin College of Music contains vocal recordings by Hoffmann. In 1995, a CD with Hoffmann's role as mayor in Leoncavallo's Der Roland von Berlin was published by Diji-Rom, New York.

Repertoire  

Hoffmann's total of 103 roles, which covered both lyrical and heroic opera, included:

 Amonasro (Aida)
 Bürgermeister (Der Roland von Berlin)
 Figaro, the barber (Der Barbier von Sevilla)
 Freudhofer (Der Evangelimann)
 Friedrich von Telramund (opera)
 Hans Heiling (Hans Heiling)
 Hans Sachs (Die Meistersinger von Nürnberg)
 Hans Stadinger (Der Waffenschmied)
 Holländer (Der fliegende Holländer)
 Jago (Otello)
 Lothario (Mignon)
 Lysiart (Euryanthe)
 Nelusco (L'Africaine)
 Orestes (Elektra)
 Papageno (Die Zauberflöte)
 Pizarro (Fidelio)
 Rigoletto (Rigoletto)
 Simeon (Joseph)
 Spielmann (Königskinder)
 Valentin (Faust)
 Wolfram von Eschenbach (Tannhäuser)

Honours 
In 1913, Hoffmann was awarded the rare title "Königlicher Preußischer Kammersänger" on the occasion of his 25th stage anniversary.

References

Further reading 
 Musik lag ihm im Blut. In Peter Ziegler: Prominenz auf Promenadenwegen. Kaiser, Könige, Künstler, Kurgäste in Bad Kissingen. Verlag Ferdinand Schöningh, Würzburg 2004, .
 Carlos Droste: Baptist Hoffmann, "Bühne und Welt", Leipzig-Berlin-Vienna 1908
 Georg Hoffmann-Küsel: Baptist Hoffmann, ein Leben für die Kunst, Dünnebeil Verlag, Berlin 1949
 Deutsche Biographische Enzyklopädie, Munich 1997
 Gerhard Wulz: Der Kapellenfriedhof in Bad Kissingen. Ein Führer mit Kurzbiografien, Bad Kissingen 2001,

External links 

 
 Hoffmann, Baptist Bayerisches Musiklexikon Online
 
 Baptist Hoffmann, Rollenbild, Brustbild, in: Richard Wagner: Der fliegende Holländer (images) performing-arts.eu

German operatic baritones
1863 births
1937 deaths
People from Bad Kissingen